Lee Township is a township in Aitkin County, Minnesota, United States. The population was 50 as of the 2010 census.

History
Lee Township was named for Olaf Lee, an early settler and native of Norway.

Geography

Lakes
 Rice Lake (south quarter)

Adjacent townships
 Spalding Township (northeast)
 Rice River Township (east)
 White Pine Township (southeast)
 Malmo Township (southwest)
 Glen Township (west)
 Kimberly Township (northwest)

Demographics
As of the census of 2000, there were 54 people, 22 households, and 17 families residing in the township. The population density was 1.6 people per square mile (0.6/km2). There were 45 housing units at an average density of 1.3/sq mi (0.5/km2). The racial makeup of the township was 98.15% White, and 1.85% from two or more races.

There were 22 households, out of which 31.8% had children under the age of 18 living with them, 68.2% were married couples living together, 9.1% had a female householder with no husband present, and 22.7% were non-families. 22.7% of all households were made up of individuals, and 9.1% had someone living alone who was 65 years of age or older. The average household size was 2.45 and the average family size was 2.76.

In the township the population was spread out, with 25.9% under the age of 18, 35.2% from 25 to 44, 20.4% from 45 to 64, and 18.5% who were 65 years of age or older. The median age was 40 years. For every 100 females, there were 107.7 males. For every 100 females age 18 and over, there were 122.2 males.

The median income for a household in the township was $28,750, and the median income for a family was $27,500. Males had a median income of $49,583 versus $18,333 for females. The per capita income for the township was $19,319. There were 7.7% of families and 5.9% of the population living below the poverty line, including no under eighteens and none of those over 64.

References
 United States National Atlas
 United States Census Bureau 2007 TIGER/Line Shapefiles
 United States Board on Geographic Names (GNIS)

Townships in Aitkin County, Minnesota
Townships in Minnesota